Hemilienardia chrysoleuca is a species of sea snail, a marine gastropod mollusk in the family Raphitomidae.

Description
The length of the shell attains 6 mm, its diameter 3.75 mm.

(Original description) The small shell has a columbelliform shape. It is white, spirally banded with bright yellow, centrally on the upper whorls, and twice, at the periphery and towards the base, of the body whorl. The shell contains 6 whorls, in our specimens imperfect as regards the protoconch. The three remaining whorls are angular below the impressed sutures, everywhere closely and obliquely ribbed, crossed by spiral incrassate lines, beautifully gemmate with small globular shining nodules at the points of junction, so that the whole surface is cancellate, the interstices being deep and smooth. The outer lip is thickened, crenulate without, eight or nine denticled within. The sinus is rather narrow, but deep and conspicuous. The columellar margin is slightly plicate, fairly straight. The siphonal canal is short.

Distribution
This marine species occurs off Cuba, Aruba, Martinique and the Virgin Islands.

References

 Wiedrick S.G. (2017). Aberrant geomorphological affinities in four conoidean gastropod genera, Clathurella Carpenter, 1857 (Clathurellidae), Lienardia Jousseaume, 1884 (Clathurellidae), Etrema Hedley, 1918 (Clathurellidae) and Hemilienardia Boettger, 1895 (Raphitomidae), with the description of fourteen new Hemilienardia species from the Indo-Pacific. The Festivus. special issue: 2-45

External links
  Tucker, J.K. 2004 Catalog of recent and fossil turrids (Mollusca: Gastropoda). Zootaxa 682:1–1295.

chrysoleuca
Gastropods described in 1923